Niemierzyno may refer to the following places:
Niemierzyno, Szczecinek County in West Pomeranian Voivodeship (north-west Poland)
Niemierzyno, Gmina Połczyn-Zdrój in West Pomeranian Voivodeship (north-west Poland)
Niemierzyno, Gmina Świdwin in West Pomeranian Voivodeship (north-west Poland)